Theodore Kryzak (died March 26, 2022) was an American politician. He served as a Republican member for the 20th district of the Maine House of Representatives.

In 2018, Kryzak won the election for the 20th district of the Maine House of Representatives. He succeeded Karen Gerrish. Kryzak died in March 2022 during serving his office which was the 20th district, at the age of 66.

References 

Year of birth missing
2022 deaths
Republican Party members of the Maine House of Representatives
21st-century American politicians
People from Acton, Maine